Suran (also Romanized as Sūrān; also known as Manşūrān) is a village in Khosrow Beyk Rural District, Milajerd District, Komijan County, Markazi Province, Iran. At the 2006 census, its population was 385, in 87 families.

References 

Populated places in Komijan County